Andrew John Guilford (born November 28, 1950) is a former United States district judge of the United States District Court for the Central District of California.

Education and career

Born in Santa Monica, California, Guilford received an Artium Baccalaureus degree from the University of California, Los Angeles in 1972.  While working on his undergraduate degree he served as president of the Sigma Pi fraternity chapter at UCLA.  He earned his Juris Doctor degree from the UCLA School of Law in 1975. He was in private practice in Costa Mesa, California, from 1975 to 2006.

Federal judicial service

On January 25, 2006, Guilford was nominated by President George W. Bush to a seat on the United States District Court for the Central District of California vacated by Dickran Tevrizian. Guilford was confirmed by the United States Senate on June 22, 2006, and received his commission on June 26, 2006.  He assumed senior status on July 5, 2019. He retired from active service on January 31, 2020.

References

External links

1950 births
Living people
20th-century American lawyers
21st-century American judges
21st-century American lawyers
California lawyers
Judges of the United States District Court for the Central District of California
People from Santa Monica, California
UCLA School of Law alumni
United States district court judges appointed by George W. Bush
University of California, Los Angeles alumni